The 1920 American Cup was the annual open cup held by the American Football Association. Bethlehem Steel had their streak of four straight American Cup wins broken this year by Robins Dry Dock of Brooklyn. The shipbuilders defeated the steelworkers 1-0 in the final on May 2nd at Harrison, New Jersey.

American Cup Bracket

(a) first match protested

Final

See also
1920 National Challenge Cup

Amer
American Cup